The 1975 Football League Cup Final took place on 1 March 1975 at the old Wembley Stadium. It was contested between Aston Villa and Norwich City. To date it is the only major domestic Cup Final played at Wembley Stadium between two clubs outside the top-flight (although both teams were promoted at the end of the season). Aston Villa won 1–0, to claim their second League Cup final victory. Ray Graydon scored the only goal of the game, following up after goalkeeper Kevin Keelan had saved his penalty onto the post.

The victorious Aston Villa manager, Ron Saunders, appeared in his third successive League Cup Final with his third different club, having been a losing manager with Norwich City in 1973 and Manchester City in 1974.

Match details

Road to Wembley

External links
Game facts at soccerbase.com

Cup Final
League Cup Final 1975
EFL Cup Finals
League Cup Final 1975
Football League Cup Final
Football League Cup Final